Roswell Town Center, formerly Roswell Mall, is a shopping center located in Roswell, Georgia, built in 1974. It is situated at the intersection of Holcomb Bridge Road and Alpharetta Highway. This mall is not to be confused with the bigger, newer North Point Mall in Alpharetta, Georgia.

In April 1994, the mall was purchased by Talisman Cos. LLC and was reformed into an open-air center. By 1997, it was referred to as "Roswell Town Center", and although it was no longer an enclosed mall, it still had two levels. Over the course of three years, the exterior was remodeled while the interior was demolished. Talisman renewed the leases for anchors K-Mart and Target (formerly Richway), while Uptons left. The movie theater, run by Startime Entertainment, was also remodeled. The renovations to the shopping center added  to the structure. Construction on the $10 million family entertainment complex began in October 1997.
The movie theater closed in 2007 due to the  late-2000's recession and reopened as a private owned movie theater in 2011.
As of 2021 the shopping center includes Gold's Gym, Big Lots,  Tuesday Morning,  Hobby Lobby.

References

Buildings and structures in Fulton County, Georgia
Demolished shopping malls in the United States
Shopping malls established in 1974
Shopping malls in Georgia (U.S. state)
Shopping malls in the Atlanta metropolitan area